The Holder 20 is an American trailerable planing sailboat that was designed by Ron Holder, in collaboration with sailmaker Dave Ulmann, as a one design racer and first built in 1980.

Production
The first 128 boats were built by Vagabond Sailboats in the United States starting in 1980. The molds were later sold to Hobie Cat (Coast Catamaran Corporation) who built 127 boats. Hobie continued production until 1987, with a total of 265 boats completed by both builders.

Design
The Holder 20 is a racing keelboat, built predominantly of fiberglass. It has a fractional sloop rig, a raked stem, a slightly reverse transom, a transom-hung rudder controlled by a tiller and an "L" shaped lifting keel. It displaces  and carries  of ballast.

The boat is normally fitted with a small  outboard motor for docking and maneuvering.

The design is normally raced with a crew of three and has sleeping accommodation for four people, with a double "V"-berth in the bow cabin and two straight settee berths in the main cabin. There are no provisions for a galley or head.

For sailing downwind the design may be equipped with a symmetrical spinnaker.

Operational history
The boat is supported by an active class club that organizes racing events, the Holder 20 One Design Class.

In a 2010 review Steve Henkel wrote, "best features: The Holder 20 is light enough to plane in a modest breeze. A long, wide cockpit offers plenty of room for crew in optimizing weight position and sail handling. A 'drop' keel (fixed but retractable for trailering) makes launching relatively easy. The boat has an active class association with a presence on the Internet ... Worst features: Crew weight is crucial for stability on a boat this small and light. Hence the Holder 20 is not recommended for carefree family daysailing. The hull can't deal with rough water; owners say you can feel the hull flex and the drop keel begin to move around in a chop. The boat can be—and has been—capsized when sailed aggressively. Despite the pretense of cruising accommodations, we'd shy away from spending even one night aboard such a confined space. As one owner put it: 'The cabin is strictly for storage.'"

See also
List of sailing boat types

References

External links
No Holds Barred in the Holder 20s By Stuart Streuli, Sailing World 20 March 2005

Keelboats
1980s sailboat type designs
Sailing yachts
Trailer sailers
Sailboat type designs by Ron Holder
Sailboat type designs by Dave Ulmann
Sailboat types built by Hobie Cat
Sailboat types built by Vagabond Sailboats